The 1965–66 Utah Redskins men's basketball team represented the University of Utah in the 1965-66 season. Head coach Jack Gardner and senior star Jerry Chambers would lead the Utes to a Western Athletic Conference championship and the Final Four of the NCAA tournament. The team finished with an overall record of 23–8 (7–3 WAC).

Roster

Schedule and results

|-
!colspan=9 style=| Regular Season

|-
!colspan=9 style=| NCAA Tournament

Rankings

NBA Draft

References

Utah Utes men's basketball seasons
Utah
Utah
NCAA Division I men's basketball tournament Final Four seasons
Utah Utes
Utah Utes